Slovenia competed at the 2004 Summer Olympics in Athens, Greece, from 13 to 29 August 2004. This was the nation's fourth consecutive appearance at the Summer Olympics since the post-Yugoslav era. The Slovenian Olympic Committee sent the nation's largest ever delegation to the Games in Olympic history. A total of 79 athletes, 56 men and 23 women, competed in 10 sports. For the second consecutive time, men's handball was the only team-based sport in which Slovenia had its representation at these Games.

The Slovenian team featured three defending Olympic champions from Sydney: double sculls pair Iztok Čop and Luka Špik, and rifle shooter Rajmond Debevec, who became the first Slovenian to compete in six Olympic Games (including two appearances for Socialist Federal Republic of Yugoslavia). Sprinter Merlene Ottey, who granted a dual citizenship in 2002, also set a historic milestone as the first female track and field athlete to participate in seventh Olympics, although she appeared for her native Jamaican team in previous editions. Handball team goalkeeper Beno Lapajne was appointed by the committee to carry the Slovenian flag in the opening ceremony.

Slovenia left Athens with a total of four medals, one silver and bronze, failing to achieve an Olympic gold for the first time since the 1996 Summer Olympics in Atlanta. Unable to defend their Olympic rowing title from the previous Games, Čop and Špik managed to settle only for the silver after losing out to France by two seconds in the men's double sculls. Meanwhile, the remaining medals were awarded to the athletes for the first time in women's judo and sailing.

Medalists

Athletics

Slovenian athletes have so far achieved qualifying standards in the following athletics events (up to a maximum of 3 athletes in each event at the 'A' Standard, and 1 at the 'B' Standard).

Men
Track & road events

Field events

Women
Track & road events

Field events

Canoeing

Slalom

Sprint

Qualification Legend: Q = Qualify to final; q = Qualify to semifinal

Cycling

Road

Handball

Men's tournament

Roster

Group play

Classification match (11th–12th place)

Judo

Five Slovenian judoka (one men and four women) qualified for the 2004 Summer Olympics.

Men

Women

Rowing

Slovenian rowers qualified the following boats:

Men

Qualification Legend: FA=Final A (medal); FB=Final B (non-medal); FC=Final C (non-medal); FD=Final D (non-medal); FE=Final E (non-medal); FF=Final F (non-medal); SA/B=Semifinals A/B; SC/D=Semifinals C/D; SE/F=Semifinals E/F; R=Repechage

Sailing

Slovenian sailors have qualified one boat for each of the following events.

Men

Women

Open

M = Medal race; OCS = On course side of the starting line; DSQ = Disqualified; DNF = Did not finish; DNS= Did not start; RDG = Redress given

Shooting 

One Slovenian shooter qualified to compete in the following events:

Men

Swimming

Slovenian swimmers earned qualifying standards in the following events (up to a maximum of 2 swimmers in each event at the A-standard time, and 1 at the B-standard time):

Men

Women

Tennis

Slovenia nominated four female tennis players to compete in the tournament.

See also
 Slovenia at the 2004 Summer Paralympics
 Slovenia at the 2005 Mediterranean Games

References

External links
Official Report of the XXVIII Olympiad
Slovenian Olympic Committee 

Nations at the 2004 Summer Olympics
2004
Summer Olympics